The Crimson Challenge is a lost 1922 American silent Western film directed by Paul Powell and written by Vingie E. Roe and Beulah Marie Dix. The film stars Dorothy Dalton, Jack Mower, Will Walling, Howard Ralston, Clarence Burton, George Field, and Beulah Dark Cloud. The film was released on April 2, 1922, by Paramount Pictures.

Plot
As described in a film magazine, Tharon Last (Dalton) is the daughter of Jim Last (Walling), the last man who led the settlers of the valley against the oppression of Basil "Buck" Courtrey (Campeau), whose rustlers terrorized the community. Courtrey admires Tharon, the only woman of the valley that he considers fit to be his mate, and murders her father to deprive her of his protection. Tharon swears revenge and becomes leader of the settlers, which results in a long struggle with many fights.

Cast
 Dorothy Dalton as Tharon Last
 Jack Mower as Billy
 Will Walling as Jim Last (credited as Will R. Walling)
 Howard Ralston as Clive
 Clarence Burton as Black Bart
 George Field as Wylackie
 Beulah Dark Cloud as Anita (credited as Mrs Dark Cloud) 
 Fred Huntley as Confora (credited as Fred Huntly)
 Irene Hunt as Ellen
 Frank Campeau as Basil Courtrey  (uncredited)

References

External links 

 

1922 films
Paramount Pictures films
Films directed by Paul Powell (director)
American black-and-white films
Lost American films
Lost Western (genre) films
1922 Western (genre) films
1922 lost films
1922 drama films
Silent American Western (genre) films
1920s English-language films
1920s American films